In geometry, Pick's theorem provides a formula for the area of a simple polygon with integer vertex coordinates, in terms of the number of integer points within it and on its boundary. The result was first described by Georg Alexander Pick in 1899. It was popularized in English by Hugo Steinhaus in the 1950 edition of his book Mathematical Snapshots. It has multiple proofs, and can be generalized to formulas for certain kinds of non-simple polygons.

Formula

Suppose that a polygon has integer coordinates for all of its vertices. Let  be the number of integer points interior to the polygon, and let  be the number of integer points on its boundary (including both vertices and points along the sides). Then the area  of this polygon is:

The example shown has  interior points and  boundary points, so its area is  square units.

Proofs

Via Euler's formula
One proof of this theorem involves subdividing the polygon into triangles with three integer vertices and no other integer points. One can then prove that each subdivided triangle has area exactly . Therefore, the area of the whole polygon equals half the number of triangles in the subdivision. After relating area to the number of triangles in this way, the proof concludes by using Euler's polyhedral formula to relate the number of triangles to the number of grid points in the polygon.

The first part of this proof shows that a triangle with three integer vertices and no other integer points has area exactly , as Pick's formula states. The proof uses the fact that all triangles tile the plane, with adjacent triangles rotated by 180° from each other around their shared edge. For tilings by a triangle with three integer vertices and no other integer points, each point of the integer grid is a vertex of six tiles. Because the number of triangles per grid point (six) is twice the number of grid points per triangle (three), the triangles are twice as dense in the plane as the grid points. Any scaled region of the plane contains twice as many triangles (in the limit as the scale factor goes to infinity) as the number of grid points it contains. Therefore, each triangle has area , as needed for the proof. A different proof that these triangles have area  is based on the use of Minkowski's theorem on lattice points in symmetric convex sets.

This already proves Pick's formula for a polygon that is one of these special triangles. Any other polygon can be subdivided into special triangles: add non-crossing line segments within the polygon between pairs of grid points until no more line segments can be added. The only polygons that cannot be subdivided in this way are the special triangles considered above; therefore, only special triangles can appear in the resulting subdivision. Because each special triangle has area , a polygon of area  will be subdivided into  special triangles.

The subdivision of the polygon into triangles forms a planar graph, and Euler's formula  gives an equation that applies to the number of vertices, edges, and faces of any planar graph. The faces are the triangles of the subdivision, and the single region of the plane outside of the polygon. To count the edges, observe that there are  sides of triangles in the subdivision. Each edge interior to the polygon is the side of two triangles. However, there are  edges of triangles that lie along the polygon's boundary and form part of only one triangle. Therefore, the number of sides of triangles obeys the equation , from which one can solve for the number of edges, .

It is also possible to go the other direction, using Pick's theorem (proved in a different way) as the basis for a proof of Euler's formula.

Other proofs
Alternative proofs of Pick's theorem that do not use Euler's formula include the following.
One can recursively decompose the given polygon into triangles, allowing some triangles of the subdivision to have area larger than 1/2. Both the area and the counts of points used in Pick's formula add together in the same way as each other, so the truth of Pick's formula for general polygons follows from its truth for triangles. Any triangle subdivides its bounding box into the triangle itself and additional right triangles, and the areas of both the bounding box and the right triangles are easy to compute. Combining these area computations gives Pick's formula for triangles, and combining triangles gives Pick's formula for arbitrary polygons.
Alternatively, instead of using grid squares centered on the grid points, it is possible to use grid squares having their vertices at the grid points. These grid squares cut the given polygon into pieces, which can be rearranged (by matching up pairs of squares along each edge of the polygon) into a polyomino with the same area.
Pick's theorem may also be proved based on complex integration of a doubly periodic function related to Weierstrass elliptic functions.
Applying the Poisson summation formula to the characteristic function of the polygon leads to another proof.

Pick's theorem was included in a 1999 web listing of the "top 100 mathematical theorems", which later became used by Freek Wiedijk as a benchmark set to test the power of different proof assistants. , Pick's theorem had been formalized and proven in only one of the ten proof assistants recorded by Wiedijk.

Generalizations

Generalizations to Pick's theorem to non-simple polygons are more complicated and require more information than just the number of interior and boundary vertices. For instance, a polygon with  holes bounded by simple integer polygons, disjoint from each other and from the boundary, has area

It is also possible to generalize Pick's theorem to regions bounded by more complex planar straight-line graphs with integer vertex coordinates, using additional terms defined using the Euler characteristic of the region and its boundary, or to polygons with a single boundary polygon that can cross itself, using a formula involving the winding number of the polygon around each integer point as well as its total winding number.

The Reeve tetrahedra in three dimensions have four integer points as vertices and contain no other integer points, but do not all have the same volume. Therefore, there does not exist an analogue of Pick's theorem in three dimensions that expresses the volume of a polyhedron as a function only of its numbers of interior and boundary points. However, these volumes can instead be expressed using Ehrhart polynomials.

Related topics
Several other mathematical topics relate the areas of regions to the numbers of grid points. Blichfeldt's theorem states that every shape can be translated to contain at least its area in grid points. The Gauss circle problem concerns bounding the error between the areas and numbers of grid points in circles. The problem of counting integer points in convex polyhedra arises in several areas of mathematics and computer science.
In application areas, the dot planimeter is a transparency-based device for estimating the area of a shape by counting the grid points that it contains. The Farey sequence is an ordered sequence of rational numbers with bounded denominators whose analysis involves Pick's theorem.

Another simple method for calculating the area of a polygon is the shoelace formula. It gives the area of any simple polygon as a sum of terms computed from the coordinates of consecutive pairs of its vertices. Unlike Pick's theorem, the shoelace formula does not require the vertices to have integer coordinates.

References

External links

 Pick's Theorem by Ed Pegg, Jr., the Wolfram Demonstrations Project.
 Pi using Pick's Theorem by Mark Dabbs, GeoGebra

Digital geometry
Lattice points
Euclidean plane geometry
Area
Theorems about polygons
Articles containing proofs
Analytic geometry